The 1994–95 Utah Utes men's basketball team represented the University of Utah as a member of the Western Athletic Conference during the 1994–95 men's basketball season. Led by head coach Rick Majerus, the Utes reached the Second Round of the NCAA tournament. The team finished with an overall record of 28–6 (15–3 WAC).

Roster

Schedule and results

|-
!colspan=9 style=| Non-conference regular season

|-
!colspan=9 style=| WAC Tournament

|-
!colspan=9 style=| NCAA Tournament

Rankings

Awards and honors
Keith Van Horn – Honorable Mention AP All-American, WAC Player of the Year

References

Utah Utes men's basketball seasons
Utah
Utah
Utah Utes
Utah Utes